The37Kamiina, often stylized as The37KAMIINA or The 37KAMIINA (and also known as "Sauna Kamiina"), is a professional wrestling stable currently evolving in the Japanese professional wrestling promotion DDT Pro-Wrestling (DDT) and on the Japanese independent scene. The stable currently consists of Konosuke Takeshita, Mao, Shunma Katsumata, Yuki Ueno and Toui Kojima. In Japanese, "37" can be read as "san-na" which sounds like "sauna"; the meaning of "Kamiina" in the members' philosophy lets anyone personally decide about it, with them stating that "It's basically what you want it to be".

History

Under Konosuke Takeshita (2021–present)

On March 12, 2021, former stable All Out had their farewell event before their disbanding. The final members of the unit were Konosuke Takeshita, Shunma Katsumata, Akito and Yuki Iino. The quartet had mutually agreed to go their separate ways earlier in the month, with founding members Takeshita and Akito already involved in different groups within the organisation. One of these groups was the DDT Sauna Club, where Takeshita and Katsumata later aligned themselves with Yuki Ueno and Mao as an official unit, even if their bonds existed since 2020 but without any official declarations. At Into The Fight 2021 the main event was a deathmatch with special rules dubbed the "Kids Room Deathmatch 37 (Sauna) Count Edition" in which Shunma Katsumata defended the DDT Extreme Division Championship against Mao. Toys such as Lego bricks, a miniature train and kid size furniture were displayed in the ring. The match had no disqualification or rope breaks, every object inside the ring was legal and any weapon introduced by the wrestlers was legal if referee Matsui deemed it "kid safe". The goal of the match was to pin the opponent for a cumulative 37-count. Katsumata convinced referee Matsui that he used to play with cinder blocks as a child in order to drop one on Mao. Both traded 2-count pinfalls in an intense bout that saw its conclusion when Katsumata donned a barbed wire laced apron and climbed the top turnbuckle for a diving splash. Mao rolled out of the way but Katsumata caught him in a cradle to get the 37th count and retain his title.

The stable had their first match as a unit on April 25, 2021, at Max Bump 2021 Tour in Nagano where Mao, Shunma Katsumata and Yuki Ueno fell short to Damnation (Mad Paulie, Daisuke Sasaki and Soma Takao). Konosuke Takeshita and Shunma Katsumata competed in the 2021 edition of the Ultimate Tag League and won it by defeating Damnation (Yuji Hino and Daisuke Sasaki) in the finals after winning the league block with a total of five points which also involved the teams of Junrestu (Jun Akiyama and Makoto Oishi), Eruption (Kazusada Higuchi and Yukio Sakaguchi) and The Iyasarerus (Chris Brookes and Antonio Honda). At CyberFight Festival 2021, a cross-over event promoted by CyberFight for its four brands DDT, Pro Wrestling Noah, Tokyo Joshi Pro-Wrestling and Ganbare Pro-Wrestling on June 6, 2021, Shunma Katsumata and Mao unsuccessfully competed against Damnation (Daisuke Sasaki, Tetsuya Endo and Soma Takao), but Konosuke Takeshita and Yuki Ueno teamed up to successfully triumph over Kaito Kiyomiya and Yoshiki Inamura. At Summer Vacation Tour in Osaka on June 26, 2021, Takeshita and Katsumata defeated Smile Pissari Harashima and Yuji Okabayashi to win the KO-D Tag Team Championship. On the finals of the 2021 King of DDT Tournament from July 4, Mao, Shunma Katsumata and Yuki Ueno defeated Junretsu's Hideki Okatani, Jun Akiyama and Makoto Oishi, and Konosuke Takeshita defeated Yuji Hino in the finals of the tournament. At Summer Vacation Tour 2021 in Shiroishi on July 18, Mao , Shunma Katsumata and Yuki Ueno unsuccessfully challenged Soma Takao, Tetsuya Endo and Yuji Hino for the KO-D 6-Man Tag Team Championship. At Wrestle Peter Pan 2021 on August 21, Shunma Katsumata and Mao fell short to Chris Brookes and Jun Kasai in a hardcore tag team match, Daisuke Sasaki defeated Yuki Ueno by technical knockout  to retain the DDT Universal Championship over him, and in the main event, Konosuke Takeshita defeated Jun Akiyama to win the KO-D Openweight Championship.

At the 2022 edition of the Ultimate Tag League, Mao and Shunma Katsumata fought in the Block B where they scored only two points after competing against the teams of Calamari Drunken Kings (Chris Brookes and Masahiro Takanashi), Damnation T.A (Daisuke Sasaki and MJ Paul), Pheromones (Yuki "Sexy" Iino and Yumehito "Fantastic" Imanari), and Disaster Box (Harashima and Naomi Yoshimura), while in the Block A, Konosuke Takeshita and Yuki Ueno won the competition with a total of six points after going against Burning (Tetsuya Endo and Jun Akiyama), Yuji Hino and Yukio Naya, Eruption (Kazusada Higuchi and Hideki Okatani), and Shuji Kondo and Kazuki Hirata. Unfortunately Takeshita and Ueno fell short to Harashima and Yoshimura in the finals on February 27, 2022, match which was also for the vacant KO-D Tag Team Championship. At Judgement 2022: DDT 25th Anniversary on March 20, Shunma Katsumata and Yuki Ueno defeated Isami Kodaka and Yukio Sakaguchi, Mao defeated Daisuke Sasaki and Jun Kasai in a hardcore match to win the DDT Universal Championship, and Konosuke Takeshita dropped the KO-D Openweight Championship to Tetsuya Endo.

Japanese independent circuit (2021–present)
Various of the stable's members sometimes do freelance work for various promotions from the Japanese independent scene. At New Year's Eve Pro-Wrestling 2021, a cross-over event held by DDT in partnership with Big Japan Pro Wrestling and Active Advance Pro Wrestling on December 31, 2021, Takeshita and Mao competed in a one-day Forget The Year! Shuffle Six Man Tag Tournament in which Takeshita teamed up with Kuishinbo Kamen and Yuji Okabayashi as "Powerlifters", and Mao with Shigehiro Irie and Yasufumi Nakanoue as "Ugo Association". Takeshita reached the finals with his tag partners, falling short to Leftovers (Daichi Hashimoto, Harashima and Kengo Mashimo).

All Elite Wrestling (2021–present)
Due to DDT and All Elite Wrestling (AEW) holding business relationships, the Japanese promotion regularly sends Konosuke Takeshita to compete in the latter promotion. He made his first appearance on the April 8, 2021 episode of AEW Dark: Elevation, where he teamed up with Kenny Omega and Michael Nakazawa to defeat Danny Limelight, Matt Sydal and Mike Sydal in a six-man tag team match. He then appeared at The House Always Wins on April 9, where he teamed with The Young Bucks (Nick Jackson and Matt Jackson), Omega and Nakazawa, falling short to Death Triangle (Pac, Penta El Zero Miedo and Rey Fénix), Matt Sydal and Mike Sydal. After a one-year break, Takeshita announced he would travel to the United States for a tour in AEW. He returned on the April 25, 2022 episode of Dark: Elevation (taped on April 20) where he defeated Brandon Cutler. Takeshita unsuccessfully challenged Jon Moxley for the interim AEW World Championship at AEW Dynmamite #145 on July 13, 2022

Members

Current
{|class="wikitable sortable" style="text-align:center;"
|-
!colspan="2"|Member
!Joined
|-
|Konosuke Takeshita
|* I
|rowspan=4|
|-
|Yuki Ueno
|*
|-
|Mao
|*
|-
|Shunma Katsumata
|*
|-
|Toui Kojima
|
|

Sub-groups

Current

Former

Timeline

Championships and accomplishments
DDT Pro-Wrestling
KO-D Openweight Championship (1 time) – Takeshita
DDT Universal Championship (3 times, current) – Mao and Ueno (2)
DDT Extreme Championship (1 time) – Katsumata
KO-D Tag Team Championship (3 times, current) – Takeshita and Katsumata (1); Mao and Asuka (1); and Mao and Katsumata (1)
KO-D 10-Man Tag Team Championship (1 time, current) – Mao, Katsumata, Ueno, Kojima and Shinya Aoki
Ironman Heavymetalweight Championship (4 times) – Katsumata (3) and Mao (1)
D-Oh Grand Prix – 
King of DDT – 
Ultimate Tag League – 
 Pro Wrestling Illustrated
 Ranked Takeshita No. 59 of the top 500 singles wrestlers in the PWI 500 in 2022
 Ranked Ueno No. 143 of the top 500 singles wrestlers in the PWI 500 in 2021
 Ranked Mao No. 309 of the top 500 singles wrestlers in the PWI 500 in 2022
 Tokyo Sports
 Fighting Spirit Award (2021) –

Notes

See also
Damnation T.A.
Burning

References

External links 

 

Independent promotions teams and stables
Japanese promotions teams and stables